Mother's Milk is a 2011 British drama film directed by Gerald Fox.

Based on the 2006 novel of the same name by Edward St Aubyn, it explores the troubled relationships between the various members of an English family over a long summer.

It stars Thomas Underhill, Jack Davenport, Adrian Dunbar, Diana Quick, and Margaret Tyzack.

Plot

References

External links
 

2011 films
British drama films
Films based on British novels
2010s English-language films
2010s British films